Bad Girls is the first novel by Argentine author Camila Sosa Villada, first published in Argentina on March 1, 2019, by Barcelona-based book publisher Tusquets Editores, which later published it in Spain on June 9, 2020. The story is set in the Argentine city of Córdoba and focuses on the lives of a group of travestis who work as street prostitutes at Sarmiento Park, among which is the narrator herself. 

The book has been a critical and commercial success. It has been translated into French, German and Croatian, and will also be released in Italian, Norwegian and Brazilian Portuguese during 2021. In February 2021, it was announced that the English-language translation was in the making and would be published by Other Press.

In October 2020, Las malas received the Sor Juana Inés de la Cruz Prize given by the Guadalajara International Book Fair. The book was also awarded the Grand Prix de l'Héroïne given by Madame Figaro and the Premio de Narrativa en Castellano given by Barcelona bookstore Finestres.

The novel will be adapted into a television series by Armando Bó.

Plot

Las Malas is a fictional autobiographical work that goes back and forth in Camila’s life. She writes her life experiences from her childhood in La Falda as an outcast boy, the only child of a lower-middle-class marriage, until her life in the city of Córdoba which she shared with a new family under the maternal wings of Auntie Encarna.
The novel is mainly set in 2002 and it is narrated by the author and protagonist. The stories are about the difficulties that she encountered during her entire life as a transgender woman, but they are also about the lives of the group of sex workers (mostly fellow trans women) that she meets at Sarmiento Park.

Themes and literary analysis
Sosa Villada mentions topics such as differences among socioeconomic classes, the atrocities committed against trans women working in the streets, and the struggle that transgender children go through, among others. The author portrays several instances of violence and trauma in an intimate tone. 

Las Malas has several elements of magical realism since it depicts a realistic view of the modern world with the incorporation of magical elements[11] that deal with intended blurred lines between fantasy and reality. Las Malas describes the oddities and the dreary realities trans people usually go through together with supernatural phenomena presented as fairy-tale-like segments disruptively. This amalgamation of real and magical elements elevates the tone while being informative and rough in content. The author describes the transformation of two characters into animals, a wolf and a bird and she includes fantastic characters, such as men without heads.

Main characters

The characters in Las Malas love life (Camila Sosa Villada said in an interview, that there is no one who loves life more than these characters) but society at large is out to suppress that joy[12].  In the same interview, she said: "They hurt me a lot. But we continue to be born, we continue to fight, we continue to resist."[13]

 Camila Sosa Villada:   Writer and protagonist of the novel.
 Auntie Encarna: The oldest one of the group, the adoptive mother. She is the owner of the pink house, the shelter where everyone in the group of travestis that worked on the Sarmiento Park went.  
 La Machi: The healer and the practitioner of black magic. She was born in Paraguay.  
 María la Muda: She is deaf and dumb. She transforms herself into a bird. “Auntie Encarna” gave her shelter and rescued her. 
 Claudia Huergo: Camila 's mother. She became the mother of Camila at a very young age and was a housewife.
 Carlos Quinteros: Camila 's father. An alcoholic and violent person who is not willing to accept Camila as a transgender person.
 Laura: The only one who is a biological woman in the group. She is pregnant with twins. 
 Nadina: Male Nurse by day, woman by night. She only wears women's clothes at night at Sarmiento Park. 
 Natalí: Half wolf, half woman (wolf woman). She is the seventh son of her family and at night she transforms into a wolf.  
 The Bright of The Eyes (El Brillo de los Ojos): The baby they find in the park. He becomes Encarna’s son.
 Sandra: The most melancholic one. She was bitten by her clients and her boyfriend.
 Aunt Silvia: A vagrant woman who had a lot of dogs. She had her legs amputated because of diabetes.
 The Ravens: Spoiled and rich boys who go to work at Sarmiento Park even though they don’t need the money. They steal the clients from the girls who are struggling to make ends meet.
 Angie: The most beautiful one. She was from Alta Gracia, Córdoba. She had a boyfriend who worked on constructions, the most beautiful man.

See also
 Transgender literature

References

2019 debut novels
2019 LGBT-related literary works
Argentine LGBT novels
2010s LGBT novels
Novels with transgender themes
Novels about prostitution
Other Press books